Eric Neilson (born 27 January 1981) is a Canadian skeleton racer who has competed since 2009. Neilson first took up the sport in 2006 and in 2009, he joined the Canadian national squad.

References

External links 
 
 
 
 
 Local racer headed to 2014 Olympics (castanet.net)

1981 births
Canadian male skeleton racers
Living people
Olympic skeleton racers of Canada
Skeleton racers at the 2014 Winter Olympics
Sportspeople from Lethbridge
20th-century Canadian people
21st-century Canadian people